Although it was believed that during the time of Ancient Greece beer was not consumed, recent archaeological excavations exposed artifacts and materials used for the production of beer. These findings date back to the Bronze Age of history (3,300 to 1,200 BC).

During modern times the first official brewery of Greece was founded in 1864. Today, Greek produced beer has slowly but surely become a part of the local culture and has expanded beyond its borders as demand has increased in numerous countries around the world. Although wine still has the highest consumption rates within Greece  beer has increased market share and has become an important industry for the Greek economy providing more than 60,000 jobs in 2005.

History 
Alcohol consumption has always been a part of the culture in Greece, although it has adapted and changed in certain aspects over the generations. Initially Greece had a strong wine drinking culture. This culture adapted and developed as beer and spirits begun to grow in popularity.

B.C. 
The Ancient Egyptians were the first to show evidence of beer consumption as they documented the brewing process on papyrus scrolls, dating back to 5,000 B.C. This process made its way from the Middle East, into European countries. Greece was one of these countries as remains associated with beer have been discovered which date back to 2135-2020 BC. Beer in Europe became more popular in the northern parts of Europe rather than Greece, as the northern crops provided key ingredients for brewers. Due to the popularity growth of Beer in the north, Greece would prefer to be associated with wine, as they often referred to northerners as ‘barbarians’.

Remains of Prehistoric Sites 
Archaeologists discovered the remains of two prehistoric buildings, providing materials to which can be used for the development and consumption of beer. A site was discovered at Archondiko (in northern Greece) and another at Agrissa (south of Archondiko on the eastern side of Greece). Remains suggest that these sites burnt down in a fire, allowing artifacts found inside to be preserved for a rather long period of time. Within the Archondiko site several cereals were discovered that date back to the “Early Bronze Age, phase IV, dated to 2135–2020 BC”, and are key determinants in the brewing of beer. Soultana Maria Valamoti published the findings in a 2018 article, including: “Triticum monococcum (einkorn), T. dicoccum (emmer), T. spelta (spelt wheat), T. aestivum/durum (free-threshing wheat) and Hordeum sp. (barley) which were found in dense, sometimes pure, concentrations indicating deliberate storage.”

Additionally to these cereals a two-chambered structure was discovered at this site. This structure is said to support temperatures of around 100 degrees Celsius, which is essential in the beer making process. Accompanying this structure there was a discovery of 30 special cups which archaeologists believe may have been used for the consumption of the beer.

Similarly to the Archondiko site the site within Agrissa was well preserved and provides instruments for beer production In Greece. The evacuation of this site was conducted in 1955, 1956 and 1958 by a German archaeologist team. Similar cereal grains were discovered as Valamoti mentions within her article, "the archaeobotanical remains from Argissa discussed here consist of at least 3,588 sprouted cereal grains that were identified to einkorn (2,319); a further 157 sprouted grains were identified as T. dicoccum (emmer) and 81 as Hordeum (barley)”.

These cereal grains are said to date back 1700–1500 BC, whilst other remains of the house are said to date back 2100–1700 BC. This is of similar time period to that of the site in Archondiko. Within the Argissa site 45 specially sculpted cups were discovered, which is another similarity between the two sites.

Modern history
The wine culture was prominent all the way until the 1800s. In 1833 the first king of Greece ‘Frederic Othon (Otto)’, settled in Greece. Otto came with scientists and specialists from his native land Bavaria, with the intentions of developing the beer industry. Initially small breweries were set up in the 1840s to serve Bavarian officials and military men who were stationed there at the time.

Among the Bavarian settlers, was Johann Ludwig Fuchs who established a small enterprise selling home-brewed beer from his house in Kolonaki. It was in 1864 when Charles Johann Fuchs, son of Johann Ludwig Fuchs, established Fix brewery in Athens, the first official brewery of Greece. Finding Beer in Greece among this time was a rarity, and was only available within the major cities. Travelers in the 1900s from Germany allowed beer consumption to continue to grow. Similar German breweries were founded in Greece, such as, Messrs. Melcher, Bachauer, Fischer, Klein, and others.

The 1900s numerous breweries were formed and beer consumption begun to grow. Within the late 19th century micro-breweries began to flourish all around Greece, which can be reflected by the consumption rates. The following table depicts the transition in the alcohol preference of the Greek nation from 1961 to 2016. Wine remains the predominant drink in Greece, though to a lesser degree than before.

Beer consumption has continually grown, increasing by a factor of five since the 1960s. Most brands are found all over Greece and are sold in supermarkets, mini markets and kiosks.

Consumption 
Beer in Greece is consumed nationally, as breweries are spread across the nation. Beer consumption in 2014 came to 3.845 million hectolitres, or 36 litres per capita. 440,000 of these hectolitres was imported to Greece. About 406,000 was imported from within the EU and the remaining 34,000 was imported externally. Looking on the production side of things, beer production in 2014 came to 3.75 million hectolitres. About 229,000 of these hectolitres were exported. Some 67,000 were exported within the EU and the remaining 162,000 were exported outside of the EU.

Popular Beers 
A survey conducted by 510 residents from all over Greece by Avgeris et al. Concluded that the three most influential factors when purchasing beer in Greece are: price, origin and brand name. Price is considered to be the most significant factor influencing consumer choice surrounding Greek beer. The survey concluded that 50.6% of the public would rather buy ‘cheaper’ beer as opposed to their local. However, if money was ruled out of the equation, the public would prefer to drink their local beer.

As stated, brand name has an influence over consumer choice surrounding beer in Greece. Avgeris et al. article establishes the five most frequently mentioned brands of beer in Greece to be, Amstel (18.9%), Fix (15.3%), Heineken (14.5%), Alfa (13.8%) and Vergina (9.4%). Four out of the five brands mentioned belong to two of the largest breweries in Greece with Amstel, Heineken and Alfa being produced by Athenian Brewery (Heineken group) and Fix by Olympic brewery (Carlsberg Group). The remaining brand Vergina belongs to Macedonian Thrace Brewery.

The factor to which the public concluded was the least influential aspect was advertisement. 70% of consumers mentioned that advertisement does not play a role when considering which beer to purchase.

Economy 
The growth of the brewery industry in Greece has provided work for the citizens as in 2014, 60,965 jobs were related to beer. Indirect employment of the same year was 4,507 jobs. Total consumer spending in 2014 was 1,689 million Euro. This is correlated to beer acting as a stimulus as within the same year beer added 494 million Euro to the Greek economy. The citizens are not the only impacted by the industry as the Government revenue in 2014 was 640 million euro. The way to which the Government generate revenue from beer is broken into five categories, which include:

 Excise duties - 107 million
 VAT (on-trade sector) - 253 million
 VAT (off-trade sector) - 62 million
 Income tax, payroll tax and social security contribution (brewing sector) - 35 million
 Income tax, payroll tax and social security contributions (other sectors) - 181 million

Beer production

Breweries 
The four major brewing companies based in Greece are the Athenian Brewery Αθηναϊκή Ζυθοποιία , a subsidiary of Heineken, holding more than 53% of the market share, the Olympic Brewery, a subsidiary of the Carlsberg Group, holding almost 27% of the market share, the Hellenic Breweries of Atalanti holding around 8% of the market share and Macedonian Thrace Brewery holding around 6%.

Microbreweries 
The first greek microbrewery was Craft beer in 1997. In 2020 there were approximately 65 active microbreweries in Greece, with approximately 6% of the country's market share. That is in comparison to 6 microbreweries that were active in 2009. This growth can be explained mainly by the increasing demand for specialized products and Greek brands in support of the local economy during the crisis. The major brewers of Greece acted upon this trend and launched brands under Greek names in order to limit the competition. Various microbrewery brand-name takeovers and buy-outs have been ongoing over the past years. According to Greek law, breweries are labeled as "microbreweries" when production is less than 200,000 hectolitres.

{| class="sortable wikitable"
! Beer Name
! Producer/Owner
! Region
! Beer Types

|-
| 56 Isles || Paros Microbrewery || Paros || Craft
|-
| Alea || Alea Brewing Company || Athens || Wit, Pale Ale, Stout, 3-way collab NEIPA
|-
| Ali || Thessaloniki Microbrewery Ltd || Thessaloniki || Craft
|-
| Amoussa || Arrib Danos || Patras || IPA, Stout
|-
| Argo, Molotov || Volos Brewery || Volos || Golden Ale, IPA
|-
| Athineo || Athenian Brewery || Athens || Seasonal
|-
| Brewtiful || Brewtiful Brewery || Chios || Double Dry Hopped New England IPA
|-
| Brinks || Rethymnian Brewery SA || Crete, Rethymno || Pale Ale
|-
| Canal Dive || Korintiaki Zithopiia SA || Corinth || Pilsner, Ale. Unfiltered, Unpasteurized
|-
| Chios Beer || Chios Beer Microbrewery ||  Vaviloi, Chios ||  Pale Ale, Porter Smoked, BBQ smoked, Weiss with mastic, IPA. Unfiltered, Unpasteurized
|-
| Corfu Beer || Kerkiraiki Zithopiia || Corfu || Pilsner, Lager, Weiss, IPA, Red Ale, Dark, Double fermentation
|-
| Delphi / Marea || Elixi Brewery || Athens || Pilsner, Dark, IPA, Blonde and more
|-
| Dias || Korfi SA || Kato Ag. Ioannis || Lager
|-
| Donkey || Santorini Brewing Company || Santorini || Lager, Weiss, IPA, Red Ale
|-
| Empati || Kythnos Beer || Kythnos || Wheat
|-
| Epilogi || Zotos Ltd || Gianitsa || Lager
|-
| Flaros || Flaros / Siris Microbrewery EE || Athens || IPA, Amber Ale, Seasonal, Wheat, Porter
|-
| Fonias || Samothraki Microbrewery || Samothraki  || Pale Ale
|-
| Harma || Cretan Brewery || Crete, Chania || Pilsner, Lager, Weiss, Pale Ale, Stout, Cretan Ale, Dunkel, Mexican
|-
| Helmisons || Helmisons Brewery || Crete, Ierapetra || Pale Ale, IPA, Witbeer, Dark Ale
|-
| Hoppy Seal || Monachus Brewing || Alonisos || Pilsner
|-
| Ikarotissa || Ikariaki Zythopiia IKE || Ikaria || Ale, Red Ale
|-
| Johnnies' Beer || Macedonian Microbrewery || Drama || Lager
|-
| Karma || Kordosis-Thamnidis OE || Nemea || Lager, Pale Ale, Red Ale, Golden Ale
|-
| Kasta || Kasta Microbrews || Crete, Heraklion || Pale Ale, IPA, Amber Ale, Oatmeal
|-
| Katsika || Folegandros Microbrewey || Folegandros || Pilsner, Biere De Garde, Red Ale
|-
| Kirki || Kirki Brewery || Piraeus || Amber Lager, Pale Ale, IPA
|-
| Kefalonian Beer || Kefalonia & Ithaki Microbrewery || Kefalonia  || Lager, Red Ale
|-
| Kykao || Kykao Nanobrewery || Patras || IPA, Stout, Seasonal, Rye, Pale Ales
|-
| Lafkas || Lafkas Brewery || Crete, Chania || Pale Ale, Stout
|-
| Levante || Mikro-Brewery of Zakynthos || Zakynthos || Pale Ale, Stout
|-
| Local || Microbrewery of Thessaly || Volos || Golden Ale, IPA
|-
| Lola || Pinios Brewery || Larisa || Pilsner, Belgian Ale, IPA
|-
| Lyra || Lyra Brauerei || Crete, Chania || Golden Ale
|-
| Magnus Magister / Knights || Magnus Magister Papadimitriou SA || Rhodes || Pilsner, Lager, Weiss
|-
| Mani Brewery || Mani Brewery || Mani || IPA, Blond, Ale, Porter
|-
| Marmita || Mikrozithopiia Kavalas OE || Kavala || Red Ale
|-
| Mikonu || Mykonos Brewing Company || Myconos || IPA, Pale Ale, Seasonal and more
|-
| Naxos Beer || Naxos Brewery || Naxos || Pilsner, IPA, Stout
|-
| Nissos || Cyclades Mircrobrewery || Tinos || Bohemian-Style Pilsner, European Lager, Dunkel
|-
| Noble Men || Noble Men Brewery || Halkida / Athens || Pilsner, IPA, Pale Ale, Abbey Triple
|-
| Noctua || Noctua Brewery Athens || Athens || Pale Ale, IPA, Black IPA, Amber Ale, Seasonal
|-
| Notos || Notos Brewery || Crete, Heraklion || Lager, Weiss, Pale Ale
|-
| Nymfi Beer || Athenian Brewery || Thessaloniki || Hoppy lager, 5% Alc
|-
| Olympica Magna || Elis Brewery || Elia || Lager
|-
| Olympos Beer || Hondrogianni Paraskevi || Katerini || Pale Lager
|-
| One Eyed Jack || Midnight Circus Gypsy Brewery || Athens || Pilsner, Red Ale, IPA, Stout
|-
| Ora || Patraiki Zithopiia IKE || Patras || Pilsner, IPA, Stout, Weiss
|-
| Plastiga || Zythopiia Georgios Papadiotis || Volos || Stout, Strong Ale, Urban Ale,  Weiss
|-
| Samos Beer || Samos Beer || Samos || Ale
|-
| Septem || Septem Microbrewery || Evia || Stout, Red Ale, Pilsner, Pale Ale, Porter and more
|-
| Sigri || Sigri Brewery || Lesvos || Red Ale, Blond Ale
|-
| Sknipa || Standard Microbrewery of Thessaloniki || Thessaloniki || Pilsner, Stout, IPA, Seasonal, Strong
|-
| Solo || Solo Brewery || Crete, Heraklion || Pale Ale, Seasonal, IPA, Porter, Stout and more
|-
| Sparta || Lakoniki Brewery || Sparta || Lager
|-
| Spira || Spira Skopelos Brewers || Skopelos || Golden Ale, IPA, Dry Stout, Weiss
|-
| Stala || Epirus Brewery Ltd || Ioannina || Cream Ale, Pale Ale, Red Ale, IPA, Seasonal
|-
| Stilvi || Zithopiia Thessalias IKE || Karditsa || Lager, Stout, Weiss
|-
| Theros || Solar Microbrewery Xanthi || Xanthi || Summer Ale, Irish Red Ale, Dunkel
|-
| Tiki Luau || Seven Island Breweries || Corfu || Fruit Ale, Stoout
|-
| Theta (Θ) || Thessaliki Brewery || Athens || Pilsner, Lager, Premium, Weiss, Seasonal
|-
| Touls Brews || Touls Brews || Patras || Pale Ale
|-
| VAMbeer || Korfi SA || Kato Agios Ioannis, Pieria || Pislner, Lager. Unfiltered, unpasteurised
|-
| VAP || VAP P Kougios SA || Rhodes || Lager
|-
| Volkan Brewery || Volkan Brewery || Athens || Pilsner, Dunkel, Wheat
|-
| Voreia Beer || Siris Microbrewery EE || Serres || Pilsner, IPA, Stout, Low Alcohol and more
|-
| Wings || The Icarian Spirit Microbrewery || Ikaria || Lager, Pale Ale
|-
| Zeos || Ζeos Ζithopiia SA || Argos || Pilsner, Lager, Weiss
|-
| Voreia Beer || Siris Microbrewery EE || Serres || Pilsner, IPA, Stout, Low Alcohol and more
|-
|}

External links

See also

References